The Italian ambassador in Ljubljana is the official representative of the Government in Rome to the Government of Slovenia.

List of representatives 
<onlyinclude>

See also
List of ambassadors to Slovenia
List of ambassadors to Slovenia

References 

 
Slovenia
Italy